The 2006 ARFU Women's Rugby Championship was the inaugural edition of the tournament. The competition occurred on the 17th and 19th of November, and was held in Kunming, China. Four teams competed in the tournament — hosts, China, with Hong Kong, Thailand, and Singapore. China won the competition after beating Hong Kong 31–7 in the final.

Standings

Bracket

Results

Semi-finals

3rd–4th place playoff

Final

References 

2006 in Asian rugby union
2006 in women's rugby union
Asia Rugby Women's Championship
Rugby union in China
Rugby union in Hong Kong
Rugby union in Singapore
Rugby union in Thailand
Asia Rugby
Asia Rugby Women's Championship